Elliot John Embleton (born 2 April 1999) is an English professional footballer who plays as a midfielder for  club Sunderland. He has also spent time on loan at Grimsby Town and Blackpool, and has represented England from under-17 to under-20 level.

Club career

Sunderland
Embleton was named on the bench on six occasions during the 2016–17 Premier League, having featured many times for the under-23 side. However, he would have to wait until the next season to make his first team debut, which came on 9 December 2017 as an injury time substitute for Lynden Gooch in a 0–0 draw with Wolverhampton Wanderers.

On 30 August 2018, Embleton joined Grimsby Town on loan until January 2019. The player established himself as a regular starter for the Lincolnshire side, scoring four goals during this period, and on 2 January 2019 the two clubs announced an extension of the loan to the end of the 2018–19 season.

On 1 February 2021, Embleton joined League One side Blackpool on loan for the remainder of the 2020–21 season.

He scored his first goal for Sunderland in a 2–1 win at Milton Keynes Dons on 14 August 2021.

Embleton scored the first of Sunderland's goals in the 2–0 win over Wycombe Wanderers in the 2022 EFL League One play-off Final that secured promotion to the EFL Championship.

International career
Embleton has represented England from under-17 to under-20 level. In May 2017, Embleton was included in an England U20 squad for the 2017 Toulon Tournament. He scored in the semi-final against Scotland. In the final, Embleton converted his penalty during the shoot-out as England defeated Ivory Coast to win the tournament.

In July 2018, Embleton was included in the England U19 squad for the 2018 UEFA European Under-19 Championship. He scored in the opening group match against Turkey.

Career statistics

Honours

Blackpool
EFL League One play-offs: 2021

Sunderland
EFL League One play-offs: 2022

References

1999 births
Living people
Footballers from County Durham
English footballers
Association football midfielders
Sunderland A.F.C. players
Grimsby Town F.C. players
Blackpool F.C. players
English Football League players
England youth international footballers

Personal life

Elliot John Embelton lives in Sacriston, Durham. He grew up in Sacriston going to St Bedes Catholic School, Sacriston following to St Leonard’s Catholic School, Durham. He won schools national football cup at u14s level at St Leonard’s.